The Ghost Of Danny Gross is the third solo album by Martin Tielli, released in 2009 on Six Shooter Records.  It is the final album to be released in the 2003 Martin Tielli Subscription Series. Most of the tracks on disc one include compositions by Jonathan Goldsmith from the film score for Lost Souls, a 1998 movie directed by Jeff Woolnough.

Track listing
Disc One
 Beautiful
 The Underbrush
 No price at all, on his head!
 Ice
 The house with the laughing windows
 The dead children
 Something in those woods (take 1)
 I saw the sun last night
 Storm
 Jet
 Flying
 The Michigan Mumbler
 We don't have any time
 L'Astronaut

Disc Two
 The Ghost of Danny Gross
 Spider, Spider, Outsider
 Sunshine Blue-Heart
 Something in those woods (take 2)
 The drumming partridge
 The little man who was not there
 Waterstriders (acoustic version)
 Spring peepers
 Wayfaring stranger
 The Ghost of Danny Gross Reprise
 The seams of a moment

2009 albums
Martin Tielli albums
Six Shooter Records albums